This is an incomplete list of the presidents of the Royal College of Physicians of Edinburgh, which was granted its Royal Charter by Charles II in 1681.

List of presidents 

Source (1681–1867): Historical Sketch and Laws of the Royal College of Physicians of Edinburgh, published by RCPE, 1867

See also 
 List of presidents of the Royal College of Surgeons of Edinburgh

References 

 

Presidents of the Royal College of Physicians of Edinburgh
Royal College of Physicians of Edinburgh
Presidents of the Royal College of Physicians of Edinburgh
Presidents of the Royal College of Physicians of Edinburgh